The Johnson House is a historic house at 518 East 8th Street in Little Rock, Arkansas.  It is a -story American Foursquare style house, with a flared hip roof and weatherboard siding. Its front facade is covered by a single-story porch, supported by Tuscan columns, and the main roof eave features decorative brackets.  A two-story polygonal bay projects on the right side of the front facade.  Built about 1900, it is one of a group of three similar rental houses on the street by Charles L. Thompson, a noted Arkansas architect.

The house was listed on the National Register of Historic Places in 1982.

See also
Johnson House (514 East 8th Street, Little Rock, Arkansas)
Johnson House (516 East 8th Street, Little Rock, Arkansas)
National Register of Historic Places listings in Little Rock, Arkansas

References

Houses on the National Register of Historic Places in Arkansas
Colonial Revival architecture in Arkansas
Houses completed in 1900
Houses in Little Rock, Arkansas
National Register of Historic Places in Little Rock, Arkansas
Historic district contributing properties in Arkansas